The following list includes famous people of various nationalities who were born in or resided for a significant period in Galicia (Eastern Europe), part of Ukraine. (18th–20th centuries).

A~F
 Roman Abraham, general of the Polish Army, born in Lviv
 Eliezer Adler, the founder of the Jewish Community in Gateshead, England, born in Stanislau 
 Shmuel Agnon, Jewish writer, the founder of modern Israeli Hebrew literature, born in Buchach
 Kazimierz Ajdukiewicz, philosopher and logician, born in Ternopil
 Izak Aloni (born Izak Schächter), Polish-Israeli chess master, born in Lviv
 Antin Angelovych, the first Greek Catholic metropolitan of Lviv (1808–14), born in Hryniv, near Bibrka
 Andrzej Alojzy Ankwicz, Count, Roman Catholic Archbishop of Lvov (1815–33), and Archbishop of Prague (1833–38), born in Cracow
 Alicia Appleman-Jurman, Jewish American writer, raised from the age of five in Buchach
 Muhammad Asad (born Leopold Weiss), Pakistan's ambassador to UN, born in Lviv
 Daniel Auster, first Hebrew mayor of Jerusalem, born in Stanislau
 Nahman Avigad, Israeli archaeologist, born in Zavalov, near Pidhaytsi 
 Jacob Avigdor, last Chief Rabbi of Drohobych, born in Tyrawa Wołoska, near Sanok
 Emanuel Ax, Jewish American pianist, born in Lviv
 Baal Shem Tov (Yisroel ben Eliezer), the founder of Hasidism
 Yosef Babad, rabbi and posek, born in Przeworsk 
 Kazimierz Feliks Badeni, Count, Minister-President of Austria (1895–97)
 Meir Balaban, historian, born in Lviv
 Adolph Baller, Austrian-American pianist, born in Brody
 Oswald Balzer, historian, born in Khodoriv, near Zidichov
 Stefan Banach, eminent mathematician, born in Cracow
 Stepan Bandera, leader of the Ukrainian nationalist movement, born in Uhryniv Staryi, near Kalush
 Iuliu Barasch, physician and writer, born in Brody
 Kazimierz Bartel, Prime Minister of Poland, born in Lviv
 Oleksander Barvinsky, Ukrainian politician, born in Shliakhnyntsi, near Ternopil 
 Eugeniusz Baziak, Archbishop of Lvov and Apostolic Administrator of Cracow, born in Ternopil 
 Józef Bem, Polish general, national hero of Poland and Hungary, born in Tarnów
 Alexander Beliavsky, Ukrainian-Slovenian chess master, born in Lviv
Elisabeth Bergner, Austrian-British actress, born in Drohobych
 St. Józef Bilczewski, Roman Catholic Archbishop of Lviv, born in Wilamowice, near Kęty 
 Josef Samuel Bloch, Austrian rabbi and deputy, born in Dukla
 Michał Bobrzyński, Governor of Galicia (1908–13), born in Cracow
 Naftali Botwin, revolutionary terrorist, born in Kamianka-Buzka
 Mieczysław Boruta-Spiechowicz, Polish general, born in Rzeszów
 Naftule Brandwein, klezmer clarinetist, born in Przemyslany
 Berl Broder (born Berl Margulis), Jewish singer, born in Brody
 Aleksander Brückner, distinguished Polish slavist and historian of literature, born in Berezhany
 Martin Buber, Jewish philosopher, lived in Lviv
 Solomon Buber, Jewish scholar, born in Lviv
 Nykyta Budka, the first Ukrainian Canadian Greek Catholic bishop, born in Dobromirka
 Arthur Frank Burns, American economist, born in Stanislau
 Zvi Hirsch Chajes, Talmudic scholar, born in Brody
 Oscar Chajes, Austrian-American chess master, born in Brody
 Georges Charpak, French physicist (Nobel Prize in 1992), born in Dubrovytsia
 Leon Chwistek, painter, logician, philosopher, born in Cracow
 Zbigniew Cybulski, Polish actor, born in Kniaże, near Stanislau
 Ignacy Daszyński, Polish politician, born in Zbarazh
 Isaac Deutscher, Polish-British political activist and historian, born in Chrzanów
 Józef Dominik, Polish chess master, born in Dobczyce
 Michael Dorfman, Yiddish and Hebrew writer, born in Lviv
 Albin Dunajewski, Roman Catholic Bishop of Cracow and Cardinal, born in Stanislau
 Arthur Dunkelblum, Belgian chess master, born in Cracow
 Karol Durski-Trzaska, general, born in Spas, near Staryi Sambir
 Elimelech of Lizhensk, great Hasidic rebbe and tzadik
 Isaac Erter, Hebrew language writer, born in Janischok
 Józef Feldman, historian, born in Przemyśl
 Ida Fink, Israeli writer, born in Zbarazh
 Salo Flohr, Czech-Ukrainian chess master, born in Horodenka
 Jacob Frank, Jewish messianic claimant who combined Judaism and Christianity
 Ivan Franko, Ukrainian writer, born in Nahuevychi, near Drohobych
 Petro Franko, Ukrainian educator, born in Nahuevychi, near Drohobych
 Karl Emil Franzos, Austrian writer, born in Chortkiv 
 Aleksander Fredro, Polish writer, born in Surochów, near Jaroslav
 Amalia Freud (born Amalia Nathansohn), the mother of Sigmund Freud, born in Brody
 Mikhail Fridman, Russian banker of Jewish descent from Lviv
 Filip Friedman, historian, born in Lviv
 Henryk Friedman, chess master from Lviv
 Yisroel Friedman, Hasidic Rebbe of Ruzhin

G~K
 Mordechai Gebirtig, Yiddish poet and songwriter, born in Cracow
 Abraham Gershon of Kitov, Hasidic rabbi of Kitov and Brody, born in Kuty
 Agenor Goluchowski, Count, interior minister of Austria (1859–60)
 Agenor Maria Gołuchowski, Count, foreign affairs minister of Austria-Hungary (1895–1906)
 Maurycy Gottlieb, Jewish painter from Drohobych
 Leopold Gottlieb, painter from Drohobych
 Chaim Gross, Austrian-American sculptor, born in Kolomyia
 Feliks Gross, Polish-American sociologist, born in Cracow
 Henryk Grossman, Polish-German economist of Jewish descent, born in Cracow
 Artur Grottger, painter, born in Ottyniowice, near Zhydachiv
 Kazimierz Górski, coach of Polish national football (soccer) team, born in Lviv
 Andrzej Kusionowicz Grodyński, Appeal Court Judge born in Gdów
 Ludwig Gumplowicz, sociologist and lawyer, born in Cracow
 Wilhelm Habsburg, Austrian archduke, colonel of the Ukrainian Sich Riflemen
 Yaroslav Halan, Ukrainian playwright and publicist from, born in Dynów.
 Ben Zion Halberstam, second Bobover Rebbe
 Chaim Halberstam of Sanz, Hasidic rabbi
 Naftali Halberstam, fourth Bobover Rebbe
 Shlomo Halberstam, first Bobover Rebbe
 Marian Hemar, poet, born in Lviv
 Zbigniew Herbert, poet, born in Lviv
 Maxim Hermaniuk, the Ukrainian Catholic Archbishop of Winnipeg, born in Nove Selo, near Horodok
 Arthur Hertzberg, Conservative rabbi and prominent Jewish-American scholar and activist, born in Lubaczów
 Tzvi Hirsh of Zidichov, the founder of Zidichov (Hasidic dynasty)
 Jerzy Hoffman, film director, born in Cracow
 Roald Hoffmann, American chemist (Nobel Prize in 1981), born in Zolochiv
 Yakiv Holovatsky, Ukrainian poet and ethnographer, born in Chepeli
 Sydir Holubovych, Ukrainian politician, born in Towsteńskie,  near Husiatyn
 Krystyna Holuj-Radzikowska, chess woman grandmaster, born in Lviv
 Shimshon Holzman, Israeli painter, born in Sambir
 Bl. Josaphata Hordashevska, Ukrainian nun, beatified by John Paul II in 2001, born in Lviv
 Moses Horowitz, playwright and actor of Yiddish theatre, born in Stanislau
 Schmelke Horowitz, rabbi of Nikolsburg in Moravia, born in Chortkiv
 Mieczysław Horszowski, pianist, born in Lviv
 Dmytro Hrytsai, Ukrainian politician and general of the Ukrainian Insurgent Army, born in Dorozhin, near Sambir
 Lubomyr Husar, head of the Ukrainian Greek Catholic Church and Cardinal, born in Lviv
 Abba Hushi, Israeli politician, born in Turka
 Naftali Herz Imber, Jewish poet who wrote the lyrics of Hatikvah, the national anthem of Israel, born in Zolochiv
 Leopold Infeld, physicist, born in Cracow
 Karol Irzykowski, writer, literary critic, theorist of film, and chess player, born in Błaszkowa, near Pilzno 
 Vasyl Ivanchuk Ukrainian world class chess player, born in Berezhany
 Alfred Jansa, Austrian Major-General, born in Stanislau
 Marian Jaworski, Roman Catholic Archbishop of Lviv and Cardinal, born in Lviv
 Max Judd, American chess master, born in Cracow
 Stepan Kachala, politician and writer, born near Berezhany
 Jaroslav Kacmarcyk, a head of the Lemko-Rusyn Republic (1918–20), born in Binczarowa
 Stefan Kaczmarz, mathematician, born in Lviv 
 Tadeusz Kantor, painter, theatre director, born in Wielopole
 Michał Karaszewicz-Tokarzewski, general of the Polish Army, born in Lviv
 Wojciech Kilar, classical and film music composer, born in Lviv
 Moise Kisling, painter, born in Cracow
 Julian Klaczko, Polish-Austrian diplomat
 Franciszek Kleeberg, general of the Polish Army, born in Ternopil
 Józef Klotz, Polish footballer, born in Crakow 
 Dmytro Klyachkivsky, commander of the Ukrainian Insurgent Army, born in Zbarazh
 Tadeusz Bór-Komorowski, general, commander-in-chief of the Home Army, born in Lviv 
 Yevhen Konovalets, Ukrainian politician and military leader, born in Zashkiv, near Lviv
 Zenon Kossak, Ukrainian politician and military leader, born in Drohobych
 Bl. Omelyan Kovch, Ukrainian Greek Catholic priest, born in Tlumach, near Kosiv
 Ignacy Krasicki, Prince-Bishop of Ermland and Archbishop of Gniezno, born in Dubiecko, near Przemyśl
 František Kriegel, Czechoslovak politician, born in Stanislau
 Walter Krivitsky, Soviet spy, born in Pidvolochysk, near Ternopil
 Nachman Krochmal, Jewish philosopher, born in Brody
 Solomiya Krushelnytska, Ukrainian opera singer
 Ivan Krypiakevych, Ukrainian historian, born in Lviv
 Volodymyr Kubiyovych, geographer, encyclopedist, politician (Ukrainian Central Committee), born in Neu Sandez
 Vasyl Kuk, commander of the Ukrainian Insurgent Army, born in Krasne, near Zolochiv 
 Viktor Kurmanovych, general, Chief of Staff of the Ukrainian Galician Army, born in Vilshanitsa near Zolochiv
 Jacek Kuroń, leader of the Solidarity movement, born in Lviv

L~O
 Manfred Lachs, Polish diplomat and jurist, born in Stanislau
 Salo Landau, Dutch chess master, born in Bochnia
 Hersch Lauterpacht, British judge, born in Zhovkva
 Pinhas Lavon, Israeli politician, born in Kopychyntsi
 Stanisław Jerzy Lec (de Tusch-Letz), writer, born in Lviv
 Stanisław Lem, writer, born in Lviv
 Juliusz Leo, politician and academic, Mayor of Cracow (1904–18), born in Stebnik, near Drohobych
 Bohdan Lepky, Ukrainian poet and writer, born in Krehulets, Husiatyn district
 Hirschel Levin, Chief Rabbi at London and Berlin, born in Rzeszów
 Kost Levitsky, Ukrainian politician, born in Tysmenytsya 
 Herman Lieberman, politician, born in Drohobych
 Ephraim Moses Lilien, Jewish photographer, born in Drohobych
 Marta Litinskaya-Shul, chess woman grandmaster, born in Lviv
 Roman Longchamps de Bérier, lawyer, the last rector of the Jan Kazimierz University, born in Lviv
 George Stephen Nestor Luckyj, scholar of Ukrainian literature, born in Yanchyn, near Lviv 
 Ignacy Łukasiewicz, inventor (petroleum industry)
 Jan Łukasiewicz, logician, born in Lviv
 Oleh Luzhnyi, football (soccer) player and coach, born in Lviv
 Vyacheslav Lypynsky, politician and historian, born in Volodymyr-Volynskyi
 Bl. Roman Lysko, Ukrainian Greek Catholic priest, born in Horodok, near Lviv
 Stanisław Maczek, general of the Polish Army, born in Szczerzec, near Lviv
 Ephraim Zalman Margolis, Talmudic scholar, born in Brody
 Max Margules, meteorologist, born in Brody
 Samuel Hirsch Margulies, Chief Rabbi of Florence, born in Berezhany
 Jan Matejko, painter, born in Cracow
 Stanislaw Mazur, mathematician, born in Lviv
 Józef Mehoffer, painter, born in Ropczyce
 Andriy Melnyk, leader of the Ukrainian nationalist movement, born near Drohobych
 Carl Menger, founder of the Austrian School of Economics, born in Neu Sandez
 Adrian Mikhalchishin, Ukrainian-Slovenian chess master, born in Lviv
 Ludwig von Mises, foremost representative of the Austrian School of Economics, born in Lviv
 Richard von Mises, mathematical physicist and statistician, born in Lviv
 Helena Modjeska, actress, born in Cracow
 Ralph Modjeski, engineer, born in Bochnia
 Kalikst Morawski, chess master, born in Boryszkowce, near Borshchiv
 Janusz Morgenstern, film director and producer, born in Mikulińce, near Ternopil
 Soma Morgenstern, writer and journalist, born in Budaniv
 Franz Xaver Wolfgang Mozart, youngest son of Wolfgang Amadeus Mozart, lived and worked in Lviv
 Andrzej Munk, film director, born in Cracow
 Lewis Bernstein Namier, British politician and historian, born in Wola Okrzejska
 Joseph Saul Nathanson, rabbi and posek, born in Berezhany
 Hryhoriy Nestor, shepherd, born in Carpathian Mountains 
 Nikifor (Epifaniusz Drowniak), Ruthenian (Lemko) painter, born in Krynica
 Leopold Okulicki, general, last commander-in-chief of the Home Army, born in Bratucice, near Bochnia
 Joseph Oleskiw, Ukrainian writer, born in Skvariava Nova, near Zhovkva
 Menachem Oren (Mieczysław Chwojnik), Polish-Israeli chess master and mathematician
 Władysław Orlicz, mathematician from Okocim
 Ostap Ortwin, literary critic, born in Tłumacz, near Stanislau 
 Bohdan Osadchuk, historian and journalist, born in Kolomyia
 Stanisław Ostrowski, third President of Poland in exile (1972–79), born in Lviv 
 Józef Maksymilian Ossoliński, Count, founder of the Ossolineum, born in Wola Mielecka, near Mielec

P~R
 Jan Parandowski, writer, essayist, and translator, born in Lviv
 Jakub Karol Parnas, biochemist, born in Mokriany, near Drohobych
 Yevhen Petrushevych, President of Western Ukrainian People's Republic, born in Busk
 Volodymyr Petryshyn, mathematician, born in Liashky Murovani, Lviv
 Simhah Pinsker, archeologist, born in Ternopil
 Oskar Piotrowski, chess master, lived in Lviv
 Mykola Plaviuk, President of Ukrainian People's Republic in exile (1989–92), born in Russiv, near Stanislav
 Rudolf Pöch, Austrian anthropologist and ethnologist, born in Ternopil  
 Stepan Popel, chess master, born in Komarniki, near Turka 
 Ignatz von Popiel, chess master, born in Drohobych
 Alfred Józef Potocki, Count, Minister-President of Austria (1870–71), born in Łańcut 
 Omeljan Pritsak, Ukrainian historian and orientalist, born in Luka near Sambir
 Włodzimierz Puchalski, photographer and film director, born in Mostki Wielkie, near Lviv
 Ivan Pulyui, Ukrainian physicist and inventor, born in Hrymailiv
 Jan Puzyna de Kosielsko, Prince, Roman Catholic auxiliary bishop of Lvov and Bishop of Cracow, Cardinal, born in Gwoździec
 Joseph Ludwig Raabe, Swiss mathematician, born in Brody
 Isidor Isaac Rabi, Austrian-American physicist (Nobel Prize in 1944), born in Rymanów
 Karl Radek, Bolshevik politician, born in Lviv
 Samuel Judah Löb Rapoport (Shir), born in Lviv
 Alfred Redl, Austrian counter-intelligence officer, born in Lviv
 Wilhelm Reich, Austrian psychoanalyst, born in Dobrzanica, a village near Peremyshliany
 Józef Retinger, Polish-Austrian-Mexican-British political adviser, born in Cracow
 Emanuel Ringelblum, Polish Jewish historian, born in Buchach
 Shalom Rokeach, first Rebbe of Belz
 Yehoshua Rokeach, second Rebbe of Belz
 Yissachar Dov Rokeach, third Rebbe of Belz
 Aharon Rokeach, fourth Rebbe of Belz
 Mordechai Rokeach, Rav of the town of Bilgoray, born in Belz
 Oleg Romanishin, chess master, born in Lviv
 Jakob Rosanes, German mathematician, born in Brody
 Jakob Rosenfeld, Chinese general, born in Lviv 
 Erna Rosenstein, painter and poet, born in Lviv
 Paul Rosenstein-Rodan, economist, born in Cracow 
 Henry Roth, American writer, born in Tysmenitz near Stanislau
 Joseph Roth, Austrian writer of Jewish descent, born in Brody
 Adam Daniel Rotfeld, Polish minister of foreign affairs, born in Peremyshliany
 Tadeusz Rozwadowski, Chief of the General Staff of the Polish Army, born in Babin, near Kalush
 Helena Rubinstein, cosmetics industrialist, born in Cracow
 Jaroslav Rudnyckyj, Ukrainian Canadian linguist, born in Przemyśl
 Edward Rydz-Śmigły, Polish marshal and commander-in-chief, born in Berezhany

S~Z
 Leopold Ritter von Sacher-Masoch, Austrian writer, born in Lviv
 Dov Sadan, scholar of Yiddish and Hebrew literature, born in Brody
 Manfred Sakel, neurophysiologist and psychiatrist, born in Nadvorna
 Adam Stefan Sapieha, Prince, Archbishop of Cracow and Cardinal, born in Krasiczyn
 Juliusz Schauder, mathematician, born in Lviv
 Heinrich Schenker, music theorist, born in Vyshnivchyk
 Moses Schorr, rabbi, assyriologist and politician, born in Przemyśl
 Bruno Schulz, poet, novelist and painter, born in Drohobych
 Sholom Mordechai Schwadron, Jewish gaon of Berezhany, born in Zolochiv
 Marcella Sembrich, born in 1858 in Wisniewczyk, in Austrian Galicia, now part of Ukraine. A consummate musician, she was a major figure in the operatic world.
 Meir Shapiro, Hasidic rabbi and rosh yeshiva
 Markiyan Shashkevych, poet and interpreter, born in Pidlissia near Zolochiv
 Andrey Sheptytsky, Count, the Metropolitan Archbishop of the Ukrainian Greek Catholic Church, born in Prylbychi, near Lviv
 Clement Sheptytsky, Count, the Archimandrite of the Studite monks, born in Prylbychi, near Lviv
 Stanisław Sheptytsky, Count, general of the Polish Army, born in Prylbychi, near Lviv
 Roman Shukhevych, the supreme commander of the Ukrainian Insurgent Army, born in Krakovets, near Yavoriv
 Władysław Sikorski, general, Prime Minister of Poland and commander-in-chief of the Polish Armed Forces (1939–43), born in Tuszów Narodowy
 Stanisław Skrowaczewski, conductor, born in Lviv
 Josyf Slipyj, head of the Ukrainian Greek Catholic Church, born in of Zazdrist, near Terebovlia
 Wacław Sobieski, historian, born in Lviv
 Stanisław Sosabowski, general, commander of the Polish 1st Independent Parachute Brigade, born in Stanislau
 Jerzy Sosnowski, major, Polish spy in Germany (1926–34) as Georg von Sosnowski, Ritter von Nalecz, born in Lviv
 Manès Sperber, novelist and psychologist, born in Zabolotiv
 Nissan Spivak, Jewish cantor and composer from Belz
 Hnat Stefaniv, Ukrainian colonel, born in Toporivtsi, near Horodenka
 Vasyl Stefanyk, writer, born in Rusiv, near Kuty 
 Hugo Steinhaus, mathematician, born in Jasło
 Yaroslav Stetsko, leader of the Ukrainian nationalist movement, born in Ternopil
 Slava Stetsko, leader of the Ukrainian nationalist movement, born in Romanivka, near Terebovlia 
 Lee Strasberg, Jewish American director, actor and producer, born in Budaniv
 Julian Stryjkowski, writer, born in Stryj
 Kyryl Studynsky, head of the People's Assembly of Western Ukraine (1939), born in Kamienka, near Ternopil
 Franciszek Sulik, chess master, born in Lviv
 Karol Szajnocha, historian, born in Komarno
 Jan Szczepanik, inventor, born in Rudniki, near Mostyska
 Jan Szembek, Count, deputy secretary in the Ministry of Foreign Affairs, born in Poręba
 Józef Szujski, historian and politician, born in Tarnów
 Stanisław Tarnowski, historian and politician, born in Dzików
 Józef Teodorowicz, Archbishop of Lviv (Armenian rite)
 Oscar Tenner, chess master, born in Lviv
 Leopold Trepper, Soviet spy, born in Nowy Targ
 Metodyj Trochanovskij, Lemko activist, born in Binczarowa
 Naftali Herz Tur-Sinai, Hebrew scholar, born in Lviv
 Adam Ulam, historian, born in Lviv
 Stanisław Ulam, mathematician, co-inventor of the H-bomb, born in Lviv
 Leopold Unger, journalist, born in Lviv
 Ivan Vahylevych, Ukrainian poet and ethnographer, born in Yasen, near Stanislav 
 Anatole Vakhnianyn, Ukrainian politician and composer, born near Przemyśl
 Bl. Vasyl Velychkovsky, Ukrainian Greek Catholic bishop (body found incorrupt), born in Stanislau
 Mykhailo Verbytsky, composer of the present National Anthem of Ukraine, born in Jawornik Ruski, near Bircza
 Dmytro Vitovsky, Ukrainian politician and military leader, born in Medukha 
 Stepan Vytvytskyi, President of Ukrainian People's Republic in exile (1954–65), born near Stanislav
 Alexander Wagner, chess theoretician, lived in Stanislau
 Dov Berish Weidenfeld, Chief Rabbi of Tchebin (Trzebinia) 
 Rudolf Weigl, biologist, lived in Lviv
 Friedrich Weinreb, Jewish philosopher, born in Lviv
 Shevah Weiss, Israeli politician, born in Boryslav
 Kazimierz Wierzyński, Polish poet, born in Drohobych
 Simon Wiesenthal, hunter of Nazis, born in Buchach
 Billy Wilder, Austrian-American film director, born in Suchá Beskidzka
 Karol Wojtyła, John Paul II, Archbishop of Cracow, and Pope (1978–2005), born in Wadowice
 Zev Wolf of Zbaraz, Rabbi of Zbarazh
 Stanisław Wyspiański, poet and painter, born in Cracow
 Volodymyr Yaniv, professor of the Ukrainian Catholic University in Rome, born in Lviv
 Daniel Yanofsky, Canadian chess master, born in Brody
 Richard Yary, Ukrainian politician, born in Rzeszów
 Grigory Yavlinsky Russian politician, born in Lviv
 Kordian Józef Zamorski, general, born near Gorlice
 Gabriela Zapolska, novelist and actress, born in Pidhaytsi
 Velvel Zbarjer, singer, born in Zbarazh
 Casimir Zeglen, inventor, born near Ternopil
 Michael Zohary, botanist, born in Bibrka near Lviv 
 Israel Zolli, Chief Rabbi of Rome who converted to Roman Catholicism, born in Brody

References

Galicia (modern period)